Zhasur Narzikulov (born 13 April 1984) is a Kazakhstani football goalkeeper who plays for FC Aktobe.

He was previously known as Zhasulan Dekkhanov and was suspended from playing football in Kazakhstan for some time.

Career

Club

Narzikulov started his career with Ordabasy.

On 26 June 2019, Narzikulov signed for FC Tobol until the end of the 2019 season. On 12 December 2019, Tobol announced that Narzikulov had left the club at the end of his contract. He left the club at the end of the year and then returned to FC Aktobe for the 2020 season.

In February 2023, it became known that Narzikulov was at the disposal of the  Turan club.

Involvement in Passport scandal
In March 2008, a campaign for passports clean-up was conducted by Football Federation of Kazakhstan. As a result, Narzikulov was found to be involved in Identity document forgery. He changed his original date of birth from 1984 to 1987, as well as his original name to Zhasulan Dekkhanov while getting Kazakhstani citizenship in 2005. As a result, he was suspended from playing football in Kazakhstan throughout season of 2008.

Career statistics

Club

International

Honours

Aktobe
Kazakhstan Premier League(1): 2007
Kazakhstan Super Cup (2): 2008, 2014

References

External links

Living people
1984 births
Association football goalkeepers
Kazakhstani footballers
Expatriate footballers in Kazakhstan
Kazakhstan international footballers
Uzbekistani expatriate sportspeople in Kazakhstan
Uzbekistan Super League players
Kazakhstan Premier League players
FK Mash'al Mubarek players
FC Atyrau players
FC Kaisar players
FC Aktobe players
FC Taraz players
FC Ordabasy players
FC Tobol players